Tham Kook Chin (born 7 November 1943) is a Malaysian wrestler. He competed in the men's freestyle lightweight at the 1964 Summer Olympics.

References

1943 births
Living people
Malaysian male sport wrestlers
Olympic wrestlers of Malaysia
Wrestlers at the 1964 Summer Olympics
Place of birth missing (living people)